GHI may refer to:

 Gardens for Health International, an American philanthropic organization
 Gatwick Handling, a British aircraft ground handling agent
 GeoHazards International, an American disaster preparedness organization
 German Historical Institutes
 Ghee, clarified butter
 Ghost Hunters International, an American television series
 Global Health Initiatives
 Global Horizontal Irradiance, the total solar radiation incident on a horizontal surface
 Global Hunger Index
 Greenbelt Homes, Inc., an American housing cooperative
 Group Health Incorporated, an American health insurance company
 Guitar Hero (video game)

See also 
 Ghee (disambiguation)